Tui Jin (also Romanized as Tū’ī Jīn and Too’ijin; also known as Tarjīn and Tū’īn) is a village in Alvandkuh-e Gharbi Rural District, in the Central District of Hamadan County, Hamadan Province, Iran. At the 2006 census, its population was 1,496, in 427 families.

References 

Populated places in Hamadan County